Roberto Cinquini (14 July 1924 – 18 July 1965) was an Italian film editor.

He edited A Fistful of Dollars (1964), directed by Sergio Leone,

He edited comedy black and white films like Arrangiatevi! (1959), directed by Mauro Bolognini, I due marescialli (1961), directed by Sergio Corbucci, and Sedotta e abbandonata (1964), directed by Pietro Germi.

He also edited Un Turco napoletano (1953), and Il medico dei pazzi (1954), both directed by Mario Mattoli.

Filmography

As editor

 I nostri mariti (1966)
 Les combinards (1966)
 Siete hombres de oro (1965)
 Los complejos (1965)
 Spy in Your Eye (1965)
 Place Called Glory City (1965)
 Secret Agent Fireball (1965)
 The Dolls (1965)
 Gunmen of Rio Grande (1964)
 Samson and the Mighty Challenge (1964)
 Bullets Don't Argue (1964)
 Corpse for the Lady (1964)
 A Fistful of Dollars (1964)
 Sallah (1964)
 Vidas ardientes (1964)
 Seduced and Abandoned (1964)
 This Shocking World (1963)
 Gli onorevoli (1963)
 The Little Nuns (1963)
 Tutto è musica (1963)
 Obiettivo ragazze (1963)
 The Hours of Love (1963)
 La vita provvisoria (1963)
 The Sweet Nights (1962)
 Los motorizados (1962)
 La cuccagna (1962)
 Alone Against Rome (1962)
 Crazy Desire (1962)
 Malesia magica (1961)
 Pastasciutta nel deserto (1961)
 Pugni, pupe e marinai (1961)
 Los dos oficiales (1961)
 Divorce Italian Style (1961)
 America by Night (1961)
 Hercules in the Valley of Woe (1961)
 The Fascist (1961)
 Cinco marinos contra cien chicas (1961)
 Square of Violence (1961)
 Garibaldi (1961)
 Un mandarino per Teo (1960)
 Son of Samson (1960)
 Las píldoras de Hércules (1960)
 Kapò (1960)
 Escape by Night (1960)
 Call Girls of Rome (1960)
 Noi duri (1960)
 Genitori in blue-jeans (1960)
 La letra (1959)
 The Facts of Murder (1959)
 You're on Your Own (1959)
 La duchessa di Santa Lucia (1959)
 The Son of the Red Corsair (1959)
 The Woman's Confidant (1959)
 Vacaciones en Cortina D'Ampezzo (1959)
 Prisoner of the Volga (1959)
 Dubrowsky (1959)
 Il terribile Teodoro (1958)
 Le bellissime gambe di Sabrina (1958)
 Toto in Paris (1958)
 Sunday Is Always Sunday (1958)
 Giovani mariti (1958)
 The Lady Doctor (1958)
 Marisa (1957)
 Lust of the Vampire (1957)
 El día mas bello (1956)
 Totò lascia o raddoppia? (1956)
 Guardias de Roma (1956)
 Storia di una minorenne (1956)
 Diablillos de uniforme (1955)
 Revelación (1955)
 Esta noche nada nuevo (1955)
 La vena d'oro (1955)
 The Queen of Babylon (1954)
 Orient Express (1954)
 Miseria y nobleza (1954)
 Noi cannibali (1953)
 Neapolitan Turk (1953)
 Sul ponte dei sospiri (1953)
 Don Lorenzo (1952)
 At Sword's Edge (1952)
 Secret of Three Points (1952)
 The Adventures of Mandrin (1952)
 Viva il cinema! (1952)
 O.K. Nero (1951)
 It's Love That's Ruining Me (1951)
 Duello senza onore (1951)
 Figaro qua, Figaro là (1950)
 The Iron Swordsman (1949)
 L'altra (1947)

As assistant director

 Peppino, le modelle e chella là (1957)
 Totò cerca pace (1954)
 Il medico dei pazzi (1954)
 Miseria y nobleza (1954)
 Las noches de Cleopatra (1954)
 Neapolitan Turk (1953)
 Siamo tutti inquilini (1953)
 Duello senza onore (1951)
 El fantasma es un vivo (1950)
 Le sei mogli di Barbablù (1950)
 Figaro qua, Figaro là (1950)
 Il vedovo allegro (1950)
 Totò cerca moglie (1950)
 Signorinella (1949)
 Totò le mokò (1949)
 Totó busca piso (1949)
 Man with the Grey Glove (1949)
 Come Back to Sorrento (1945)

References

External links
 

1924 births
1965 deaths
Italian film editors